Order of National Hero may refer to:
 Order of the National Hero (Antigua and Barbuda)
 Order of National Hero (Bahamas)
 Order of National Heroes (Barbados)
 Order of the National Hero (Belize)
 Order of National Hero (Georgia)
 Order of the National Hero (Grenada)
 Order of National Hero (Jamaica)
 Order of the National Hero (Saint Kitts and Nevis)
 Order of the People's Hero (Yugoslavia)